Merchants Square is a 20th-century interpretation of an 18th-century-style retail village in Colonial Williamsburg, Virginia, United States. It is listed on the National Register of Historic Places.

History
Conceived in 1927 by John D. Rockefeller, Jr. and Reverend W. A. R. Goodwin, Merchants Square is considered to be one of the first planned shopping districts in the United States, if not the first. Small shops throughout Williamsburg would move into a centrally located area that used architecture that was in harmony with the restoration's character. William G. Perry, chief architect of the Williamsburg Restoration, designed the shopping district.

Most of the stores and shops are located on Duke of Gloucester Street (DoG St.) right across from The College of William & Mary’s campus. To keep the area as close to historical accuracy as possible, all telephone wires were placed underground, and modern day technologies such as air-conditioning ducts and garage equipment were hidden with shrubs and plantings.

Present day

Today there are over 40 shops and restaurants located in Merchants Square. The area is also used for other purposes, such as seasonal concerts, a farmers' market, and special movie screenings.

References

External links

Merchants Square official website

Historic districts on the National Register of Historic Places in Virginia
Buildings and structures in Williamsburg, Virginia
Colonial Williamsburg
Commercial buildings on the National Register of Historic Places in Virginia
1927 establishments in Virginia
Commercial buildings completed in 1927
National Register of Historic Places in Williamsburg, Virginia